William Eden (1 July 1905 – 1993) was an English footballer who played as an outside left for Darlington, Sunderland, Tranmere Rovers and New Brighton. He made 152 appearances for Tranmere, scoring 31 goals.

References

1905 births
1993 deaths
Footballers from Stockton-on-Tees
Footballers from County Durham
Association football outside forwards
English footballers
Loftus Albion F.C. players
Darlington F.C. players
Sunderland A.F.C. players
Tranmere Rovers F.C. players
New Brighton A.F.C. players
English Football League players